The flag of the Dominican Republic represents the Dominican Republic and, together with the coat of arms and the national anthem, has the status of a national symbol. The blue on the flag stands for liberty, the white for salvation, and the red for the blood of heroes. The civil flag follows the same design, but without the charge in the center. The flag was designed by Juan Pablo Duarte.

Description

As described by Article 21 of the Dominican Constitution, the flag features a centered white cross that extends to the edges and divides the flag into four rectangles; the top ones are blue (hoist side) and red, and the bottom ones are red (hoist side) and blue. The national coat of arms, featuring a shield with the flag design and supported by a bay laurel branch (left) and a palm frond (right), is at the center of the cross. Above the shield, a blue ribbon displays the national motto Dios, Patria, Libertad (English: God, Homeland, Liberty). Below the shield, the words República Dominicana appear on a red ribbon (this red ribbon is depicted in more recent versions as having its tips pointing upward). In the center of the shield, flanked by three spears (two of them holding Dominican banners) on each side, is a Bible with a small cross above it and said to be opened to the Gospel of John, chapter 8, verse 32, which reads Y la verdad os hará libres (And the truth shall make you free). It is one of 28 national flags to contain overtly Christian symbols. Additionally, along with Haiti, Bolivia, Costa Rica, Ecuador, El Salvador, and Venezuela, it is one of only seven national flags whose design incorporates a depiction of the flag itself.

Presidential Standard

Other flags

Historical

Gallery

See also

List of Dominican Republic flags

References

External links

Flag
National flags
Flags with crosses